Carlos Aníbal San Martín (born July 2, 1971 in La Plata, Argentina) is a former Argentine footballer who has played in clubs of Argentina and Chile. After his retirement, he worked as assistant goalkeeper coach in the Chile national football team under Claudio Borghi.

Teams
  Estudiantes de La Plata 1991-1992
  Defensores de Cambaceres 1993-1995
  Defensa y Justicia 1996-1999
  Audax Italiano 1999-2005
  Everton 2006
  La Plata FC 2007-2008

References
 

1971 births
Living people
Argentine footballers
Argentine expatriate footballers
Estudiantes de La Plata footballers
Defensores de Cambaceres footballers
Defensa y Justicia footballers
Everton de Viña del Mar footballers
Audax Italiano footballers
La Plata FC footballers
Chilean Primera División players
Argentine Primera División players
Expatriate footballers in Chile
Association football goalkeepers
Footballers from La Plata